The Latting Observatory was a wooden tower in New York City built as part of the 1853 Exhibition of the Industry of All Nations, adjoining the New York Crystal Palace. It was located on the North side of 42nd Street between Fifth Avenue and Sixth Avenue across the street from the site of present-day Bryant Park. It could handle up to 1,500 people at a time. It burned down in 1856.

The Latting Observatory was an inspiration for the Eiffel Tower.

Rise
None of the accounts of the tower mention steam elevators, and so it would appear that they were never installed. Ascent was possible using winding stairways with several intermediate landings. The ascent to the top of the structure was described as "fatiguing, but it improves digestion."

Demise
The building was acquired by the Hydeville Marble Works shortly after the end of the fair in 1854; the firm removed the top 75 feet of the tower a year later.

The observatory burned down in a fire that started between midnight and 1:00 AM on August 30, 1856 in a cooper's shop located at 49 West 43rd Street. The fire spread rapidly and attracted spectators from around the city, with flames that were visible for miles around. Though the fire destroyed more than twelve buildings and several families were left homeless, there were no known injuries or fatalities related to the incident. The Hydeville Marble Works, which owned the observatory, suffered a loss of $100,000 on merchandise and structures, of which $17,500 was covered by four different insurance companies. The New York Times described the fire as "one of the most destructive conflagrations that has occurred in the City for a long time..." with property valued at a total of $150,000 destroyed, most of which was accounted for by the tower itself. The Times described the tower as a "conspicuous landmark, by which the traveler could ascertain his whereabouts" and that it would be "greatly missed" despite the fact that as an investment it was "a stupendous failure" that never paid a return on the $150,000 in capital stock raised to erect the structure.  Spectators feared that the tower would topple on and crush the north side of the Crystal Palace, but the observatory burned down on its base into a "mass of smouldering cinders". Fire companies from Williamsburg and elsewhere in Brooklyn were ferried across the East River to assist in extinguishing the blaze.

Legacy

Engineer Gustave Eiffel acknowledged that the origin of the idea for an observation tower "came from America" but that his tower in Paris improved upon the American version in several ways. The Latting Observatory was built "without regard for beauty of form and purely for commercial purpose" in contrast to the Eiffel Tower, built some thirty years later with attention to form.

See also
 List of tallest structures built before the 20th century

References

Demolished buildings and structures in Manhattan
World's fair architecture in New York City
Towers completed in 1853
1850s architecture in the United States
Bryant Park buildings